Petitions to the Holy See are part of the mode of government of the Catholic Church.

References

Petitions
Canon law of the Catholic Church